Napa-1, also known as RTAF-SAT-1, is a Thai Earth observation satellite. It is the first satellite of the Royal Thai Air Force. The satellite was built by Dutch firm Innovative Solutions In Space (ISISpace). After being delayed several times partially due to the COVID-19 pandemic, the satellite was launched on 3 September 2020, on Arianespace Vega rocket's flight VV16.

Spacecraft
The nano satellite is based on Innovative Solutions In Space's ISISpace 6U CubeSat and is designed to function for three years. It carries a Gecko Imager manufactured by South African firm SCS Space, and a prototype TriScape100 Imager from Simera Sense. Napa-1 will use the two instruments for remote sensing, including disaster relief such as combating floods and wildfire detection. According to the Bangkok Post, the satellite cost less than 100 million baht.

References

External links
 NAPA-1 website

Earth imaging satellites
Satellites of Thailand
Spacecraft launched in 2020
2020 in Thailand
Spacecraft launched by Vega rockets